Burntcoat Head (improperly known as Burncoat) is an unincorporated rural Canadian community in Hants County, Nova Scotia. The area is known for having the largest tidal range (the greatest difference in height between high tide and low tide) of any location in the world.

Etymology 
The origin of the name "Burntcoat" or "Burncoat", as the community is sometimes named, is unknown. The derivation of the spelling of the name is also unclear. Today the village on the west side of the Noel Bay is named Burntcoat, however, the Acadians named the village on the east side of the Noel Bay "Pointe Brull" (i.e., Burnt Point or Burnt Coast). Perhaps the Protestant settlers who came after the exodus of the Acadians from the community confused the names for the east and west side of the Noel Bay and thought the west side of the bay was "Pointe Brull".

The Acadian name for west side of Noel Bay (i.e., present day Burntcoat) was "Pointe Cloche", indicating a chapel was likely located on the west side of the bay at Noel, Nova Scotia.

Tidal range 
Burntcoat Head is located near the eastern end of the Bay of Fundy. Burntcoat Head had a public wharf that has been the location of a tide gauge since the 19th century. The tide gauge at Burntcoat Head was operated by the Canadian Hydrographic Service and has recorded the highest tidal range in the world. Currently, the tidal gauge is no longer in operation.

The Guinness Book of World Records (1975) declared that Burntcoat had the highest tides in the world:
“The Natural World, Greatest Tides: The greatest tides in the world occur in the Bay of Fundy.... Burntcoat Head in the Minas Basin, Nova Scotia, has the greatest mean spring range with 14.5 metres (47.5 feet) and an extreme range of 16.3 metres (53.5 feet).”

The National Geographic magazine (August 1957) also made a similar assertion: “The famous tides of the Bay of Fundy move with deceptive quiet.  Sheltered from the open sea, they ebb and flood to a recorded range unequal in the rest of the world.”

Like pretty much every place along the ocean around the world, Burntcoat Head experiences two high tides and two low tides each day. The Bay of Fundy fills and empties with approximately 160 billion tonnes of water twice a day. On average it takes 6 hours and 13 minutes between high and low tide.  As soon as the tide has reached its lowest or highest point it will change directions and either begin to come to shore or flow back out. The tide times change by approximately by one hour daily.

Spring tides happen twice a month when the sun, moon, and earth are aligned. During this alignment the tides rise higher than average. Neap tides occur during the first and third quarter moon. During this time the high tides heights are lower than average.

Ecosystems 
At low tide the ocean floor becomes exposed allowing different species and ecosystems to be found along the shoreline and within tide pools.  Barnacles, periwinkles, slipper limpets, moon snails, horse mussels, leafy bryozoa, and whelks can be found along the ocean floor. False angel wing and Atlantic mud-piddock can be found burrowed into the sandstone. Dead man's fingers and mermaid's glove which are sponges can be found washed up on shore. The five main crab species that can be found within the tidal pools are green crab, hermit crab, lady crab, toad crab, and rock crab. The popular fish species that can be found in tidal pools are tommy cod, Atlantic mackerel, smallmouth bass, eels, monkfish, and flounder.

Burntcoat Head is a popular location for migrating shorebirds, which include sandpipers, whimbrels, yellowlegs, willets, and plovers. During low tide when mud flats are exposed the birds will consume mud shrimps before heading south for the winter months.

From mid-May to mid-October a tidal reveal is offered by knowledgeable guides who provide a shoreline exploration. The tour is offered at low tide and allows visitors a guided tour of the ocean floor. Visitors are able to be hands-on when exploring and learning about shorelife ecosystems that live within the tidal pools and mudflats. Visitors will also learn about the tides and history of the shorelines of Burntcoat and surrounding areas.

Geology 
Burntcoat is a part of the Triassic Lowlands Region. The Minas Basin and Cobequid Bay was formed from rivers that eroded from the Bay of Fundy. Burntcoat Head shoreline and ocean floor is made from Triassic red sandstones and conglomerates. Fossils and bones of animals that travelled the Triassic Lowland Region can be found within the rocks of Burntcoat Head. Over the years skulls from an archosaur known as Teraterpetion and backbones of a dicynodont have been found within the rocks along the shoreline.

The sandstone shoreline in the area erodes from the sea level rising and falling, as well as from the currents produced by the tides. Erosion causes sediment of sand, pebbles, and mud to be washed up and down the Cobequid Bay with the incoming and outgoing tides. The sediment forms sand bars along the shorelines, as well as in the Shubenacadie River.

History 
Noel Doiron and his family built a chapel in Burntcoat on the west side of the Noel Bay, when Burntcoat was known as "Steeple Point". The Acadians in the Noel Bay vacated the community in 1750, a year after the founding of Halifax by the British. The first settlers in Burntcoat after the Acadians were three Faulkner brothers, Thomas, William, and Robert (buried in Burntcoat), who were Ulster Scots people. Their maternal grandfather, Edward Faulkner (m. Martha Steward) immigrated from Ireland to Massachusetts; Edward dies in 1756 in the Battle of Fort Oswego during the Seven Years' War. Edward's daughter Hannah married her adopted brother Robert Faulkner Sr. and Thomas, William, and Robert are their sons. The family moved from Massachusetts and settled across the Cobequid Bay from Burntcoat in Londonderry Township, Nova Scotia (Glenholme). During the 19th century there were a number of shipyards in Burntcoat.

Lighthouse 
The Burntcoat lighthouse guided wooden sailing ships since the Golden Age of Sail in Nova Scotia. Built in 1858, the lighthouse was built on land which eventually became an island. A narrow neck of land connected it with the mainland. After the strip of land was eroded, the inhabitants went to and from the lighthouse by climbing up and down the bank by means of a ladder. There were five kerosene lamps that were cleaned and lit every evening. The lighthouse keeper of the first lighthouse saw the crashing of the schooner the Only Son (1898).  This vessel belonged to the Mariner of Minasville, Captain William Scott.  The vessel was being sailed by his sons in a storm and was dashed to pieces off the rocks of Burntcoat.  The sons survived and the only part of the vessel that remains is the vessel's guiding light. The first lighthouse was eventually lost to erosion of the coast.
The lighthouse was re-built in its present site in 1913. The lighthouse was kept by William Faulkner and his family, on whose land the lighthouse was built. The gas light in this house was raised every evening on a 76 ft. tower.   During the Great Depression, a German mail plane crashed off the coast at 3:30 am on 6 October 1931. Many local residents, including the lighthouse keeper Thomas Faulkner, heard the loud roar of the plane over their homes and then an explosion in the bay and then silence.  Fifteen minutes after the crash, Faulkner heard screams from the water. He made his way to the Noel wharf to see if a rescue boat was available. There was a schooner, however, Faulkner had to wait for an hour before the tide was high enough to push it off. While he waited, the pilots continued to scream. After an hour, as the schooner began to float, the pilots fell silent. After a twelve-hour search, the bodies of the pilots were not found. The only remnant of the plane that was found was the gas tank. A week later, a pilot's body was found by a passing tugboat. Immediately after the event, Thomas Faulkner reported that he thought he could have saved the men had he had a boat ready. The local newspaper reported that the crew were trying to set a record for mail delivery from Europe to New York.

The lighthouse burned in 1972. To commemorate the history of the lighthouse and the site where the highest tides in the world have been recorded, the community rebuilt the lighthouse in 1995. Burntcoat Head Park is currently operated by the Municipality of East Hants and operates seasonally during the months May–October. Burntcoat Head park contains a replica lighthouse and walking trails and displays that interpret the natural and human history of the Minas Basin. The replica lighthouse contains an interpretive centre that provides information about the tides, past lighthouses, and history about the surrounding area. Burntcoat has one of the only two lighthouses remaining in all of Hants county. The other lighthouse is in Walton, Nova Scotia.Lighthouse keepers:
Nathan Smith 1859-1873
William Faulkner 1874-1883
Fred H. Faulkner 1884
John Prescott Mosher 1884-1898
William Y. Faulkner 1898-1916
William Burton Faulkner 1916
David Webber 1917-1918
W.H. Faulkner 1919
William Burton Faulkner 1919-1949
Erwin Faulkner 1949-1960

References

External links
 Burntcoat Head Park
 Burntcoat Head Lighthouse, Nova Scotia Lighthouse Preservation Society web page
Burntcoat Head tide tables 

Communities in Hants County, Nova Scotia
Ulster-Scottish Canadian culture in Nova Scotia